Brockway Moran & Partners is a private equity firm focused on leveraged buyout investments in middle-market companies across a range of industries.

The firm, which is based in Boca Raton, Florida, was founded in 1998.  The firm has raised approximately $1.3 billion and completed more than 50 investments since inception across three private equity funds.

History
The firm was founded in 1988 by Peter Brockway and Michael Moran who were previously partners at Miami-based Trivest, one of the early leveraged buyout firms in the 1980s.

The firm raised its first fund, with $200 million of investor commitments in 1998, and its successor fund raised $410 million in 2002.  Brockway Moran completed fundraising for most recent private, with $700 million of investor commitments, in 2006.

The firm's portfolio of investments includes Woodstream Corporation, Pacific Crane Maintenance, Tri-Star Electronics International, MW Industries, Air Medical Group, Latham International, GED Integrated Solutions, Pennant Foods Corporation and Celeste Industries Corporation.  Among Brockway Moran's historical realized investments are Gold's Gym, Cosmetic Essence, Integrated Aerospace, Norwesco and TTM Technologies.

References

External links

Financial services companies established in 1998
Private equity firms of the United States
Companies based in Boca Raton, Florida